Burnout or burn-out may refer to:

Entertainment
Burnout (film), a 2017 Moroccan film
Burn Out (film), a 2017 French film
Burnout (ride), a Funfields amusement ride in Australia
Burnout (series), a racing game series created by UK company Criterion Games, with a notable emphasis on dangerous driving and crashes
Burnout (video game), the first game of the same series
Burnout: Championship Drag Racing, a 1998 video game
"Burn Out" (CSI), an episode from the seventh season of the television series CSI: Crime Scene Investigation
Burn Out (G.I. Joe), a fictional character in the G.I. Joe universe, member of the Dreadnoks

Music

Albums
Burn Out (album), a 1998 album by Christian pop punk band Slick Shoes
Burnout (Ox album), a 2009 album by Canadian band Ox
Burnout (Anarbor album), 2013 album by alternative rock band Anarbor

Songs
"Burn Out" (Sipho Mabuse song), 1983
"Burnout", a song by Green Day from Dookie, 1994
"Burn Out", a song by TGT from Three Kings, 2013
"Burn Out" (Midland song), 2017
"Burn Out" (Martin Garrix and Justin Mylo song), 2018
"Burnout" (10 Years song), 2018

Other uses
Burnout (clothing), devoré, a fabric technique particularly used on velvets
Burnout (vehicle), when a vehicle's tires are spun so they produce smoke
Occupational burnout, characterized by exhaustion, cynicism, and reduced professional efficacy within the workplace

See also
Burned Out (disambiguation)